The Tamir gol mine (Tamir River) is an iron mine located in the Tüvshrüülekh sum of Arkhangai aimag in central Mongolia.

References 

Iron mines in Mongolia